Les Biches is a 1968 drama film directed by Claude Chabrol. It depicts a tortured love triangle between characters portrayed by Stéphane Audran and Jacqueline Sassard; Jean-Louis Trintignant also stars. Audran won the Silver Bear for Best Actress at the 18th Berlin International Film Festival. The film had a total of 627,164 admissions in France.

While the film does not acknowledge any literary sources, Les Biches is loosely based on Patricia Highsmith's 1955 novel The Talented Mr. Ripley, with the main characters' genders being switched. Chabrol's screenwriter Paul Gégauff had previously adapted the novel into Purple Noon in 1960.

Plot
On the Pont des Arts in Paris, a rich and beautiful woman, Frédérique, picks up a penniless female street artist called Why. Frédérique seduces Why and takes her to her villa in Saint Tropez. The villa is occupied by two gay friends of Frédérique, Robegue and Riasis. At a party, Why meets an architect, Paul Thomas. She leaves the party with him. They are followed by Robegue and Riasis, acting on Frédérique's orders. They watch as Paul sleeps with Why.

Frédérique visits Paul and sets out to seduce him. The two start having an affair. Frédérique invites Paul to move into the villa, kicking out Robegue and Riasis. One morning Why finds a note saying that Paul and Frédérique have gone to Paris. She follows them and goes to Frédérique's apartment. Discovering Frédérique alone, Why confesses to being jealous of both Frédérique and Paul. Frédérique tells Why she finds her love repulsive, and Why stabs her with a poisoned dagger. Why calls Paul, pretending to be Frédérique, and invites him to the apartment. When he arrives Why is waiting for him dressed in Frédérique's clothes.

Cast
 Jean-Louis Trintignant - Paul Thomas
 Jacqueline Sassard - Why
 Stéphane Audran - Frédérique
 Nane Germon - Violetta
 Serge Bento - Bookseller
 Henri Frances
 Henri Attal - Robèque
 Dominique Zardi - Riais

Production
Chabrol later admitted he included the lesbian plot in order to help the film at the box office. It was the first film he made with producer André Génovès.
 
Chabrol talked about the story:
It is about the equilibrium of such a relationship, when someone else intervenes about the bargains that people make with each other. And about the rich, the advantage that they have over the poor, their richness.  They can buy people, and the poor have to submit, until they revolt, and the only possible revolt is destruction. It is from a Marxist point of view but it is not political at all. I'm sure you cannot make a revolution with a camera. But you can show up all the people and things you dislike.

Reception
Les biches was not successful at the box office but it has become one of Chabrol's more famous movies. It revived his reputation critically after a series of disappointing films.

Chabrol said later the film marked a creative turning point for him. "With the films since Les Biches I think I'm finally on the right track," he said. "I knew I was interested in murder but what I didn't realise is that my interest isn't in solving puzzles. I want to study the human behaviour of people involved in murder."

References

External links

Les Biches at TCMDB
Review of film at Roger Ebert
Review of film in New York Times
Review of film at Senses of Cinema

1968 films
1960s erotic drama films
French erotic drama films
French LGBT-related films
Lesbian-related films
Films directed by Claude Chabrol
Films shot in Saint-Tropez
Films set in Paris
Italian erotic drama films
Films with screenplays by Paul Gégauff
1968 LGBT-related films
1968 drama films
1960s French-language films
1960s Italian films
1960s French films